The 1991 U.S. Men's Clay Court Championships was an Association of Tennis Professionals men's tennis tournament held in Charlotte, North Carolina in the United States. The event was part of the ATP World Series category of the 1991 ATP Tour. It was the 23rd edition of the tournament and was played on outdoor clay courts and held from May 6 to May 13, 1991. Seventh-seeded Jaime Yzaga won the singles title.

Finals

Singles

 Jaime Yzaga defeated  Jimmy Arias 6–3, 7–5
 It was Yzaga's only singles title of the year and the 4th of his career.

Doubles

 Rick Leach /  Jim Pugh defeated  Bret Garnett /  Greg Van Emburgh 6–3, 2–6, 6–3
 It was Leach's 2nd title of the year and the 20th of his career. It was Pugh's 3rd title of the year and the 22nd of his career.

References

External links 
 ATP – Tournament profile
 ITF – Tournament details

 
U.S. Men's Clay Court Championships
U.S. Men's Clay Court
U.S. Men's Clay Court Championships
U.S. Men's Clay Court Championships